Zinn is a German occupational surname, which means someone who works with tin, a tin blacksmith. The name may refer to:

Surname
A. L. Zinn (c. 1888–1957), Justice of the New Mexico Supreme Court
Amalia Emma Sophie Zinn (1807–1851) Danish composer and memorist
Ben Zinn (born 1937), Israeli engineer and football player 
Elfi Zinn (born 1953), German athlete
Frank Zinn (1885–1936), American baseball player
Fred Zinn (1892–1960), American aviator and photographer
Georg August Zinn (1901–1976), German politician
George Zinn (1842–1899), American general
Guy Zinn (1887–1949), American baseball player
Howard Zinn (1922–2010), American historian
Jean Zinn-Justin (born 1943), French physicist
Jimmy Zinn (1895–1991), American baseball player
Johann Gottfried Zinn (1727–1759), German scientist
Johann Ludvig Zinn (1734–1802), German-Danish merchant 
Jon Kabat-Zinn (born 1944), American physician
Maxine Baca Zinn (born 1942), American sociologist
Lothar Zinn (1938-1980), German chess player
Ray Zinn (born 1937), American businessman
Ronald Zinn (1939–1965), American athlete
Russel W. Zinn (born 1951), Canadian judge
Rusty Zinn (born 1970), American musician
Walter Zinn (1906–2000), Canadian physicist
William V. Zinn (1903–1989), British civil engineer and Buddhist

First name 
Zinn Beck (1885–1981), American baseball player

See also
 Zin (disambiguation)
 Zinner
 Zinnemann

German-language surnames
Jewish surnames